WCBL (1290 AM) is an oldies-formatted radio station licensed to Benton. Kentucky, United States, and serving the broader Jackson Purchase region of western Kentucky, including Paducah. The station is owned by Jim Freeland in conjunction with Calvert City, Kentucky–licensed classic country station WCCK (95.7 FM) The station's studios and transmitter are located on Eggner's Ferry Road in Benton.

In addition to its primary AM signal, WCBL is also simulcast on full-power station WCBL-FM (99.1 MHz). Licensed to Grand Rivers, it broadcasts from a transmitter in rural southern Livingston County southeast of Smithland.

History
The station began broadcasting on December 13, 1954. It was originally owned by local politician James Shelby McCallum, who also owned a theater in the town of Benton and a few other towns. He also started WCBL-FM when it was launched in 1966. McCallum once persuaded then-future Kentucky governor Edward T. Breathitt to go into politics at a Hopkinsville based-theater he owned at that time. McCallum was also involved in civic matters locally in Marshall County, where Benton is located, and also served as part-owner of Benton’s cable television system. McCallum owned the station under licensee Purchase Broadcasting until his 1987 death. Afterwards, owner Jim Freeland, who became general manager of the station seven years before, ended up owning the station. 

WCBL mostly played country music for much of its first three decades on the air until 2000, when it was moved to WCCK. WCBL now simulcasts the oldies format with WCBL-FM.

In popular culture
In 1980, a control booth for WCBL was used in the filming of a scene in the Loretta Lynn biography movie, Coal Miner's Daughter. One of that movie’s writers was from the area.

References

External links 

 

CBL-AM
Radio stations established in 1954 
Oldies radio stations in the United States